Bethany United Methodist Church is a historic church in Lodgepole, South Dakota.  It was built in 1890 and was added to the National Register in 1987.

It is notable as one of the earliest churches built in South Dakota, and "is architecturally significant as part of an important group of churches influenced by the 1852 publication Upjohn's Rural Architecture."

When listed the building was in deteriorated condition.

References

Methodist churches in South Dakota
Churches on the National Register of Historic Places in South Dakota
Gothic Revival church buildings in South Dakota
Churches completed in 1890
Churches in Perkins County, South Dakota
National Register of Historic Places in Perkins County, South Dakota